Corey Hilliard (born April 26, 1985) is a former American football offensive tackle who played seven years in the National Football League (NFL). He played college football at Oklahoma State, before being drafted by the New England Patriots in the sixth round of the 2007 NFL Draft. Hilliard has also been a member of the Indianapolis Colts, Cleveland Browns, Detroit Lions, and New York Jets.

Pre-Draft
Corey Hilliard attended the NFL Combine.

He measured in at 6'5" 308 pounds. He ran the 40 yard dash in 5.38 (1.86 10 yard split), ran the 20 yard shuttle in 4.65, and ran the 3 cone in 7.45. He had a vertical jump of 27", a broad jump of 8'10", and bench pressed 225 pounds 28 times.

At his Pro Day, he improved his vertical jump to 29" and had a broad jump of 8'5".

Professional career

New England Patriots
Hilliard was drafted in the sixth round of the 2007 NFL Draft to the New England Patriots. However, on September 1, he was cut from the team.

Indianapolis Colts (2007-2008)
In the 2007 NFL season, Hilliard made 3 appearances for the Colts, and in the 2008 NFL season, Hilliard made 2 appearances.

Cleveland Browns
For the 2009 NFL season, Hilliard left the Colts, and joined the Cleveland Browns.

Detroit Lions
On December 10, 2009, Hilliard joined the Detroit Lions. Despite not playing a game for the Lions, Hilliard was resigned as an exclusive free agent for the 2010 NFL season.

Hilliard played all 16 regular season games for the Lions in 2010 and 2011, and also played in their post-season wild card round defeat to the New Orleans Saints (as of March 2015, this is Hilliard's only postseason appearance).

Hilliard did not play in the 2012 NFL season,  but on March 1, 2013, Hilliard signed a 2-year contract extension with the Lions. Hilliard played 9 games during the 2013 NFL season.

In the Lion's opening game of the 2014 NFL season against the New York Giants, Hilliard suffered a Lisfranc injury his right foot, ruling him out of the rest of the 2014 season. He was placed on the Injured reserve list.

New York Jets
Hilliard was signed by the New York Jets on March 24, 2015. He announced his retirement from football on May 8, 2015.

References

External links
Detroit Lions bio
Oklahoma State Cowboys bio

1985 births
Living people
Players of American football from New Orleans
American football offensive tackles
Oklahoma State Cowboys football players
New England Patriots players
Indianapolis Colts players
Cleveland Browns players
Detroit Lions players
New York Jets players